Torfyanovka is a border crossing point between Russia and Finland. It is located in Leningrad Oblast. With over 2 million annual crossings, it is the busiest border crossing in the Finnish-Russian border, which is also the border of the European Union and Russia. European route E18 passes through Torfyanovka.

See also 

 Vaalimaa, the border crossing point on the Finnish side of the border

References 

Rural localities in Leningrad Oblast
Finland–Russia border crossings